Gamma-aminobutyric acid receptor subunit rho-3 is a protein that in humans is encoded by the GABRR3 gene. The protein encoded by this gene is a subunit of the GABAA-ρ receptor.

References

Further reading

External links 
 

Ion channels